Patricia Ann Soul (September 22, 1940 – April 5, 1968), known professionally as Maelcum Soul, was an American bartender, artist's model, and actress. In the 1960s, she portrayed leading characters in two of filmmaker John Waters' earliest works, Roman Candles and Eat Your Makeup.

Early life and education 
Patricia Ann Soul was born September 22, 1940. She studied painting at the Maryland Institute College of Art and worked at the Fat Black Pussycat Cafe on Minetta Lane in New York City.

Career 
Soul later worked as a barmaid at Martick's (later Martick's Restaurant Francais), a bistro run by Morris Martick on Mulberry Street in Baltimore. Here, she also worked as an artist's model. Her role in Baltimore was compared with Paris' Kiki de Montparnasse. Starting November 4, 1966, Martick's hosted "The Maelcum Show" with 25 art works of her nude, created by different artists, including her husband Dudley Grant with various styles and mediums. Some pieces were made of stained glass and cardboard cutouts. During her life, most "young-Turk" artists of Baltimore used Soul as a model. Earl Hofmann painted her as a surrealistic giant towering over Baltimore. In response to the exhibit, Soul reported "It’s very funny to see 25 of yous staring at you. It's a happy things, a fun thing, I feel like it’s my birthday."

John Waters called Maelcum Soul “my first star”, adding "she was ahead of her time". She was known for her wild looks, with burnt red hair, white chalk makeup, and very long eyelashes. Waters said she scared everyone, including him, but he loved her. She starred in his first Dreamland-produced movie, Roman Candles, as the Smoking Nun. For Waters' next movie, Eat Your Makeup, she played as the Governess. The third movie she was in was Dorothy, the Kansas City Pothead. She was to play the Wicked Witch, but very little was shot and the project was abandoned. Waters said that she was a "big influence" on him, Divine, and his makeup artist, Van Smith.

Artistry 
The name Maelcum Soul is of Czech origin. She is described as bohemian "in both the old-baltimore and art-world sense of the word." Soul was reportedly considered the "Alice Prin" of Baltimore. She was known for dyeing her hair an "iron-ore red" and wearing heavy eyeliner and "hip haberdashery" drawing from the style of the Berlin cabarets of Weimar Republic.

Personal life 
Soul married Maryland Art Institute student Dudley Gray. She lived in Baltimore and New York City. Soul was described by John Waters as a bohemian. In 1968, she died from a drug overdose. She is buried in Bohemian National Cemetery in Baltimore.

Legacy 
Posthumously, The Evening Sun reported that despite a short and "busy" life, Soul achieved "a certain fame." She became "semilegendary among younger admirers of the beat generation. A dozen artists painted her." Soul has been described as a "fabled starlet."

Filmography 
Roman Candles (1966) as Smoking Nun
Eat Your Makeup (1968) as Governess
Dorothy, the Kansas City Pothead (1968) as Wicked Witch

See also 
History of the Czechs in Baltimore

References

External links

The Maelcum Soul Story on YouTube

1940 births
1968 deaths
Actresses from Baltimore
Artists from Baltimore
American people of Bohemian descent
Burials at Bohemian National Cemetery (Baltimore)
Deaths from kidney failure
Place of birth missing
Drug-related deaths in Maryland
Maryland Institute College of Art alumni
American bartenders
American artists' models
20th-century American actresses
American film actresses